The 21st season of Taniec z gwiazdami, the Polish edition of Dancing With the Stars, started on 2 March 2018. This is the eighth season aired on Polsat. Paulina Sykut-Jeżyna and Krzysztof Ibisz returned as hosts and Iwona Pavlović, Michał Malitowski and Andrzej Grabowski returned as judges. Ola Jordan replaced Beata Tyszkiewicz as the fourth judge.

Couples

Scores

Red numbers indicate the lowest score for each week.
Green numbers indicate the highest score for each week.
 indicates the couple eliminated that week.
 indicates the returning couple that finished in the bottom two or three.
 indicates the couple saved from elimination by immunity.
 indicates the winning couple.
 indicates the runner-up.
 indicates the couple in third place.

Average score chart 
This table only counts for dances scored on a traditional 40-points scale.

Highest and lowest scoring performances 
The best and worst performances in each dance according to the judges' 40-point scale are as follows:

Couples' highest and lowest scoring dances

According to the traditional 40-point scale:

Weekly scores
Unless indicated otherwise, individual judges scores in the charts below (given in parentheses) are listed in this order from left to right: Iwona Pavlović, Andrzej Grabowski, Ola Jordan and Michał Malitowski.

Week 1: Season Premiere
No elimination took place. At the end of the show it was revealed that Popek & Janja had the highest combined total of judges' scores and viewer votes, and the bottom two were Antek & Agnieszka and Jarosław & Lenka, who had the lowest total of judges' scores.
Running order

Week 2: Passion Night
Running order

Week 3: Wedding Party
Running order

Week 4: Polish Friday
Running order

Week 5: Hometown Glory
Running order

Week 6: The Crazy 90's
Running order

Week 7:  Dedications Night
Running order

Week 8: Romantic Places
Running order

Week 9: Semifinal
Running order

Dance-off

Running order

Week 10: Season Finale
Running order

Other Dances

Dance chart
The celebrities and professional partners danced one of these routines for each corresponding week:
Week 1 (Season Premiere): Cha-cha-cha, Jive, Tango, Waltz
Week 2 (My passion): One unlearned dance (introducing Foxtrot, Quickstep, Salsa, Paso Doble, Viennese Waltz, Jazz)
Week 3 (Wedding Party): One unlearned dance (introducing Rumba)
Week 4 (Polish Friday): One unlearned dance (introducing Samba, Argentine Tango)
Week 5 (Hometown Glory): One unlearned dance (introducing Contemporary) and Disco Marathon
Week 6 (The Crazy 90's): One unlearned dance and dance-offs
Week 7 (Dedications Night): One unlearned dance and one repeated dance
Week 8 (Romantic Places): One unlearned dance and one repeated dance  Dariusz & Katarzyna and Katarzyna & Tomasz: One unlearned Latin dance & One unlearned Ballroom dance
Week 9 (Semifinal: Judges' choice and Zbigniew Wodecki Tribute): Judges' choice, one repeated dance and dance offs
Week 10 (Season Finale): Rivals' choice, couple's favorite dance of the season and Freestyle

 Highest scoring dance
 Lowest scoring dance
 Performed, but not scored
 Bonus points
 Gained bonus points for winning this dance-off
 Gained no bonus points for losing this dance-off

Call-out order

 This couple came in first place with the judges.
 This couple came in last place with the judges.
 This couple came in last place with the judges and was eliminated.
 This couple was eliminated.
 This couple withdrew from the competition.
 This couple was saved from elimination by immunity.
 This couple won the competition.
 This couple came in second in the competition.
 This couple came in third in the competition.

Guest performances

Rating figures

References

External links
 

Season 21
2018 Polish television seasons